The George H. Williams Townhouses, commonly known as "The Lawn" apartments, located in northwest Portland, Oregon, United States, are listed on the National Register of Historic Places. The three-unit townhouse structure was built for, and originally owned by, George Henry Williams, a former United States Attorney General, United States Senator (for Oregon), and Oregon Supreme Court Chief Justice.  Later, Williams also served as mayor of Portland.  The townhouses were built as a business investment, and Williams did not reside in the building.  The structure was moved in 1922.  Although always situated within the block bounded by NW 18th and 19th Avenues, and NW Couch and Davis Streets, it was originally in the block's northwest corner, i.e. at the southeast corner of the intersection of NW 19th and Davis. In 1922, it was moved east within the same block, to the corner at NW 18th and Davis.

See also
 National Register of Historic Places listings in Northwest Portland, Oregon

References

External links
"Historic Mansion Was Once Home of Portland 'Starvation Cult'" from Offbeat Oregon History 

1883 establishments in Oregon
Houses completed in 1883
National Register of Historic Places in Portland, Oregon
Individually listed contributing properties to historic districts on the National Register in Oregon
Northwest Portland, Oregon
Residential buildings on the National Register of Historic Places in Oregon
Victorian architecture in Oregon